Reidar Alveberg (June 20, 1916 – December 12, 2004) was a Norwegian bobsledder who competed in the 1950s. He finished 13th in the four-man event at the 1952 Winter Olympics in Oslo.

He was born in Berg and died in Oslo.

References
1952 bobsleigh four-man results
Bobsleigh four-man results: 1948-64.

1916 births
2004 deaths
Bobsledders at the 1952 Winter Olympics
Norwegian male bobsledders
Bobsledders at the 1956 Winter Olympics
People from Troms
Sportspeople from Troms og Finnmark